Benjamin Anthony Jeffery (born 31 July 1991) is an English former first-class cricketer.

Early life and career 
Jeffery was born at Camden in July 1991.  He was educated at Charterhouse, before going up to St John's College, Oxford.  He played first-class cricket while studying at Oxford, making his first-class debut for Oxford University against Cambridge University in The University Match of 2011, with Jeffery also featuring in The University Matches of 2012 and 2013.  While at Oxford, he also made three first-class appearances for Oxford MCCU, with two matches in 2012 and one in 2014.  In six first-class matches, Jeffery scored 133 runs at an average of 13.30 and a high score of 39.

After graduating from Oxford, Jeffery moved into consultancy, in which he is currently employed by Boston Consulting Group.  He also turns out regularly for Grayswood Cricket Club in the I'anson Cricket League.

Notes and references

External links

1991 births
Living people
People from Camden Town
People educated at Charterhouse School
Alumni of St John's College, Oxford
English cricketers
Oxford University cricketers
Oxford MCCU cricketers